Gothabhaya, also known as Meghavannabhaya, Gothakabhaya and Goluaba, was a king of the Anuradhapura Kingdom of Sri Lanka whose reign lasted from 254 to 267. During his reign, Gothabhaya renovated several temples and monasteries and also built a new temple. He is the last of three princes who seized the throne from King Vijaya Kumara and ruled the country. He is known for banishing 60 Buddhist monks who followed teaching contradictory to Theravada, and also for rebelling against his friend Samghabodhi to seize the throne himself.

Legacy
Gothabhaya had two sons named Jetthatissa and Mahasena. He entrusted the education of his sons to a South Indian monk named Sanghamitta who had befriended him. This turned out to be a key point in Sri Lankan history since Mahasena, who had embraced the Vaitulya doctrines taught by Sanghamitta, constructed the Jetavana temple which became one of the country's three main schools of Buddhism during the Anuradhapura period despite Gothabhaya's efforts to arrest the spread of Vaitulyavada.

See also
 List of Sri Lankan monarchs
 History of Sri Lanka

References

External links
 Kings & Rulers of Sri Lanka
 Codrington's Short History of Ceylon

262 deaths
Monarchs of Anuradhapura
Year of birth unknown
G
G
G